Leslie Warren Stott, (born 8 December 1946), is an English born form New Zealand cricketer who played one One-Day International for New Zealand in 1979.

In retirement, Stott has worked as a cricket administrator, a commentator and a coach.

Domestic career
Stott was a lower-order right-handed batsman and a medium-paced right-arm bowler who played New Zealand domestic cricket for Auckland for 15 seasons from 1969/70 – 1983/84.

International career
His only taste of international cricket came in the 1979 Cricket World Cup in England. He played in New Zealand's opening match against Sri Lanka and took three wickets in an easy victory. But he lost his place for the remainder of the tournament and did not regain it in subsequent series and seasons.

1946 births
Living people
New Zealand cricketers
New Zealand One Day International cricketers
Auckland cricketers
Cricketers from Rochdale
People educated at Auckland Grammar School